Statistics of Nemzeti Bajnokság I in the 1936–37 season.

Overview
It was contested by 14 teams, and MTK Hungária FC won the championship.

League standings

Results

References
Hungary - List of final tables (RSSSF)

Nemzeti Bajnokság I seasons
Hun
1